, commonly known as T. Hawk, is a fictional character in the Street Fighter series. He made his first appearance in the 1993's Super Street Fighter II as one of the four new characters introduced in the game. In the series, he is a Native American warrior from Mexico whose ancestral homeland was taken over by Shadaloo, forcing him into exile. Critical commentary of T. Hawk has focused on the portrayal of the character's heritage as an indigenous person of the Americas.

Development
During the development of Super Street Fighter II, T. Hawk was named "Geronimo", but it was changed after an American staff member suggested that the name "Geronimo" might be seen as racially offensive. T. Hawk's hairstyle was also changed from an Elvis-style haircut to something more consistent with his heritage on the suggestion of a staffer from Capcom's US office named Steve Patton, who is of Native American heritage.

T. Hawk was introduced as the second "grappler" style character in the series; he is much quicker and more maneuverable than the series' other large type characters such as Zangief and Sagat, in spite of his massive frame. Moves such as the long-range "Condor Dive" are examples where his primary strategic aim does not involve grabbing an opponent up close.

Appearances

In video games
T. Hawk is one of the four new characters introduced in Super Street Fighter II. He is a member of the fictional Thunderfoot indigenous American clan, whose homeland was taken over 30 years before the events of the game by M. Bison, who also murdered his father, Arroyo Hawk. Thunder Hawk enters the tournament to reclaim his homeland from Bison. T. Hawk has always been billed as originating from Mexico. His backstory states that he was born in the Sonoran desert and that he resides in the Monte Albán plains. His second appearance as a playable character was in the home versions of Street Fighter Alpha 3, in which he leaves his home village after the disappearances of some of the locals. His last opponent before fighting Bison is Juli, one of Bison's bodyguards. The girl T. Hawk is searching for is revealed to be Julia, who was captured and brainwashed into becoming one of Bison's assassins named Juli. T. Hawk again returns in Super Street Fighter IV. He has regained his homeland following the events of the Street Fighter II series, but must fight Shadaloo once more, this time to rescue Julia, who has disappeared again. His rival is El Fuerte, who challenges him after a previous, as yet undisclosed defeat at T. Hawk's hands.

Other appearances
In the 1994 live-action film version of Street Fighter, T. Hawk is played by Gregg Rainwater and is a military sergeant serving the Allied Nations Peacekeeping Force under Colonel Guile. In this version he is portrayed as a Native American. 

He also makes a small appearance in Street Fighter II: The Animated Movie, in which he travels to America to seek out and defeat Ken Masters. During the fight, T. Hawk makes it clear that he has heard of Ryu, and though he appears enraged when Ken claims that he is not as challenging an opponent as Ryu, T. Hawk implies a desire to find and fight Ryu. Despite landing some good blows, T. Hawk is defeated, and he develops a new respect for Ken, but this brief fight is observed by one of Shadaloo's monitor cyborgs and provides Bison with information about Ken's backstory with Ryu, leading him to seek out and recruit Ken in Ryu's stead.

In the American cartoon series Street Fighter, T. Hawk's has temporarily quit the Street Fighters to work for Satin Hammer as an undercover agent. Unlike in the games, T. Hawk has the ability to fly in the first two episodes he appears in, but for unknown reasons, the power wears off later on.

Reception 
UGO.com listed T. Hawk as one of Street Fighter'''s "unforgettable characters," alongside Blanka, Chun-Li, Sagat, M. Bison, Zangief, Dhalsim, Vega, Balrog, E. Honda, Guile, Cammy, Dee Jay, and Fei Long. In 2011, Dorkly ranked him as the third most stereotypical character in video games, commenting on his appearance: "This is what science imagines men looked like back when dinner meant choking a woolly mammoth to death." In 2012, Complex magazine ranked T. Hawk as the second most stereotypical character in video games, commenting, "this fighter sets an entire people back to teepees and scalping" and adding, "Ah , if you die in a John Wayne movie, it will be only fitting." They also placed him 23rd in their article titled "Street Fighter: The Best Warriors in the History of the Series", stating he became "an absolute powerhouse" by the time of his appearance in Super Street Fighter IV. On the other hand, GamesRadar included this "obligatory Native American" on their 2012 list of the worst Street Fighter characters ever. Gavin Jasper from Den of Geek ranked T. Hawk 66th on his list of Street Fighter characters, and considered him to be lacking in interesting qualities while calling a version of the character in the Street Fighter cartoon a doofus. Jasper described his existence in the series as part of a mid-’1990s fad of including token Native American characters in popular media. T. Hawk is ranked 58th in a worldwide Street Fighter'' character poll held between 2017 and 2018.

References

Action film characters
Capcom protagonists
Fictional indigenous peoples in Mexico
Fictional Mexican people in video games
Fictional Native American people 
Male characters in video games
Street Fighter characters
Video game characters introduced in 1993